Isabella, Pennsylvania may refer to the following populated places:

 Isabella, Chester County, Pennsylvania
 Isabella, Fayette County, Pennsylvania